The Scarlet Flower is a 1977 Soviet fantasy film directed by Irina Povolotskaya based on the fairy tale of the same name by Sergey Aksakov.

Plot 
One merchant is about to go on a trip and promises to bring his daughters the gifts they want. Two older daughters wished beautiful fabrics, and the youngest wanted the scarlet flower, which she dreamed about.

Cast 
 Marina Ilyichyova as Alyona
 Lev Durov as Merchant
 Alla Demidova as Auberin
 Aleksey Chernov as Old Man
 Aleksandr Abdulov as Prince
 Valery Garkalin as a guy in the village (uncredited)
 Olga Korytkovskaya as Arina
 Yelena Vodolazova as Akulina
 Valentin Gneushev as Yegorka
 Dmitri Pokrovsky as guard (uncredited)

References

External links 
 

1977 films
1970s Russian-language films
Soviet fantasy films
Films based on fairy tales
Films based on Beauty and the Beast
1970s fantasy films
Gorky Film Studio films